Gyeongbokgung, also known as Gyeongbokgung Palace  or Gyeongbok Palace, was the main royal palace of the Joseon dynasty. Built in 1395, it is located in northern Seoul, South Korea. The largest of the Five Grand Palaces built by the Joseon dynasty, Gyeongbokgung served as the home of Kings of the Joseon dynasty, the Kings' households, as well as the government of Joseon.

Gyeongbokgung continued to serve as the main palace of the Joseon dynasty until the premises were destroyed by fire during the Imjin War (1592–1598) and abandoned for two centuries. However, in the 19th century, all of the palace's 7,700 rooms were restored under the leadership of Prince Regent Heungseon during the reign of King Gojong. Some 500 buildings were restored on a site of over 40 hectares.  The architectural principles of ancient Korea were incorporated into the tradition and appearance of the Joseon royal court.

In the early 20th century, much of the palace was systematically destroyed by Imperial Japan. On January 21, 1963, it was designated as a cultural property. Since the 1990s, the walled palace complex is gradually being restored to its original form. It also houses the National Palace Museum and the National Folk Museum within the premises of the complex.

Overview

Gyeongbokgung was built three years after the Joseon dynasty was founded and it served as its main palace. With Mount Bugak as a backdrop and the Street of Six Ministries (today's Sejongno) outside Gwanghwamun Gate, the main entrance to the palace, Gyeongbokgung was situated in the heart of the Korean capital city. It was steadily expanded before being reduced to ashes during the Japanese invasion of 1592.

For the next 273 years the palace grounds were left derelict until being rebuilt in 1867 under the leadership of Regent Heungseon Daewongun. The restoration was completed on a grand scale, with 330 buildings crowded together in a labyrinthine configuration. Within the palace walls were the Outer Court (oejeon), offices for the king and state officials, and the Inner Court (naejeon), which included living quarters for the royal family as well as gardens for leisure. Within its extensive precincts were other palaces, large and small, including Junggung (the Queen's residence) and Donggung (the Crown Prince's residence).

Due to its status as the symbol of national sovereignty, Gyeongbokgung was extensively damaged during the Japanese occupation of the early 20th century. In 1911, ownership of land at the palace was transferred to the Japanese Governor-General. In 1915, on the pretext of holding an exhibition, more than 90% of the buildings were torn down. Following the exhibition, the Japanese leveled whatever still remained and built their colonial headquarters, the Government-General Building (1916–26), on the site. Only a handful of iconic structures survived, including the Throne Hall and Gyeonghoeru Pavilion.

Restoration efforts have been ongoing since 1990. The Government-General Building was removed in 1996 and Heungnyemun Gate (2001) and Gwanghwamun Gate (2006-2010) were reconstructed in their original locations and forms. Reconstructions of the Inner Court and Crown Prince's residence have also been completed.

History

14th—16th centuries

Gyeongbokgung was originally constructed in 1394 by King Taejo, the first king and the founder of the Joseon dynasty, and its name was conceived by an influential government minister named Jeong Do-jeon. Afterwards, the palace was continuously expanded during the reign of King Taejong and King Sejong the Great. It was severely damaged by fire in 1553, and its costly restoration, ordered by King Myeongjong, was completed in the following year.

However, four decades later, Gyeongbokgung Palace was burnt to the ground during the Japanese invasions of Korea of 1592-1598 when Koreans angry at the court of King Seonjo for evacuating Seoul torched the royal residence. The royal court was moved to the Changdeokgung Palace. The Gyeongbokgung palace site was left in ruins for the next three centuries.

19th century
In 1867, during the regency of Daewongun, the palace buildings were reconstructed and formed a massive complex with 330 buildings and 5,792 rooms. Standing on 4,657,576 square feet (432,703 square meters) of land, Gyeongbokgung again became an iconic symbol for both the Korean nation and the Korean royal family. In 1894, the Japanese occupied the palace and forced Gojong to establish a pro-Japanese government. In 1895, after the assassination of Empress Myeongseong by Japanese agents, her husband, Emperor Gojong, left the palace. The Imperial Family never returned to Gyeongbokgung.

20th—21st centuries

In 1915, it was used as the site for the Joseon Industrial Exhibition with new exhibition buildings being erected in the grounds.

Starting from 1911, the colonial government of the Empire of Japan systemically demolished all but 10 buildings during the Japanese occupation of Korea and hosted numerous exhibitions in Gyeongbokgung, ongoing demotion was opposed by Yanagi Sōetsu. In 1926, the government constructed the massive Japanese General Government Building in front of the throne hall, in order to eradicate the symbol and heritage of the Joseon dynasty. Gwanghwamun Gate, the main and south gate of Gyeongbokgung, was relocated by the Japanese to the east of the palace. A further exhibition, the Chosun Exhibition, followed in 1929.

The palace faced further damage when the wooden structure of the relocated Gwanghwamun Gate was completely destroyed amid the devastation of the Korean War.

Gyeongbokgung's original 19th-century palace buildings that survived both the Japanese rule of Colonial Korea and the Korean War include: 
Geunjeongjeon (the Imperial Throne Hall) — National Treasure No. 223.
Gyeonghoeru Pavilion — National Treasure No. 224.
Hyangwonjeong Pavilion; Jagyeongjeon Hall; Jibokjae Hall; Sajeongjeon Hall; and Sujeongjeon Hall.

Modern archaeological surveys have brought 330 building foundations to light.

Restoration

In 1989, the South Korean government started a 40-year initiative to rebuild the hundreds of structures that were destroyed by the colonial government of the Empire of Japan, during the period of occupied Colonial Korea (1910-1945).

In 1995, the Japanese General Government Building, after many controversial debates about its fate, was demolished in order to reconstruct Heungnyemun Gate and its cloisters. The National Museum of Korea, then located on the palace grounds, was relocated to Yongsan-gu in 2005.

By the end of 2009, it was estimated that approximately 40 percent of the structures that were standing before the Japanese occupation of Korea were restored or reconstructed.  As a part of phase 5 of the Gyeongbokgung restoration initiative, Gwanghwamun, the main gate to the palace, was restored to its original design.  Another 20-year restoration project is planned by the South Korean government to restore Gyeongbokgung to its former status.

Layout

Main Gates of Gyeongbokgung
Gwanghwamun (광화문, The Main and South Gate)
Heungnyemun (흥례문, The Second Inner Gate)
Geunjeongmun (근정문, The Third Inner Gate)
Sinmumun (신무문, The North Gate)
Geonchunmun (건춘문, The East Gate)
Yeongchumun (영추문, The West Gate)

Oejeon (외전, Outer Court)
Geunjeongmun (근정문, The Third Inner Gate)
Geunjeongjeon (근정전, The Throne Hall)
Sajeongjeon (사정전, The Executive Office)
Sujeongjeon (수정전)
Cheonchujeon (천추전)
Manchunjeon (만춘전)

Naejeon (내전, Inner Court)
Gangnyeongjeon (강녕전, The King's Quarters)
Gyotaejeon (교태전, The Queen's Quarters)
Jagyeongjeon (자경전, The Queen Dowager's Quarters)

Donggung (동궁, Palace of the Crown Prince)
Jaseondang (자선당, The Crown Prince's and Princesses' Quarters)
Bihyeongak (비현각, The Study of the Crown Prince)

Pavilions
Gyeonghoeru (경회루, The Royal Banquet Hall)
Hyangwonjeong (향원정)

Bridges
Yeongjegyo (영제교)
Having passed through the initial main gate (Gwanghwamun Gate, 광화문) and secondary gate (Heungnyemun Gate, 흥례문), visitors would pass over a small bridge named Yeongjegyo (영제교). Located on the top of the canal right next to the bridge were several imaginary creatures known as Seosu. 
Chwihyanggyo (취향교)
Chwihyanggyo was originally located on the north side of the island and was the longest bridge constructed purely of wood during the Joseon Dynasty; however, it was destroyed during the Korean War. The bridge was reconstructed in its present form on the south side of the island in 1953.

Buildings

Gwanghwamun

Gwanghwamun is the main gate of Gyeongbokgung Palace.

Geunjeongjeon

Geunjeongjeon, also known as Geunjeongjeon Hall, is the throne hall where the king formally granted audiences to his officials, gave declarations of national importance, and greeted foreign envoys and ambassadors during the Joseon dynasty.  The building was designated as Korea's National Treasure No. 223 on January 8, 1985. 
Geunjeongmun, aligned and located directly to the south of Geunjeongjeon, is the main gate to the courtyard and to Geunjeongjeon. The gate is divided into three separate aisles, and only the king was allowed to walk through the center.

Geunjeongjeon was originally constructed in 1395 during the reign of King Taejo, but was burned down in 1592 when the Japanese invaded Korea. The present building was built in 1867 when Gyeongbokgung was being reconstructed. The name Geunjeongjeon, created by the minister Jeong Do-jeon, means "diligent governance hall".

Constructed mainly of wood, Geunjeongjeon sits on the center of a large rectangular courtyard, on top of a two-tiered stone platform. This two-tiered platform is lined with detailed balustrades and is decorated with numerous sculptures depicting imaginary and real animals, such as dragons and phoenixes. The stone-paved courtyard is lined with two rows of rank stones, called pumgyeseok, indicating where the court officials are to stand according to their ranks.  The whole courtyard is fully enclosed by wooden cloisters.

Sajeongjeon

Sajeongjeon, also called Sajeongjeon Hall, is a building used as the main executive office by the king during the Joseon Dynasty. Located behind Geunjeongjeon Hall, the king carried out his executive duties and held meetings with the top government officials in Sajeongjeon.

Two separate side buildings, Cheonchujeon and Manchunjeon, flank the west and east of Sajeongjeon, and while Sajeongjeon is not equipped with a heating system, these buildings are equipped with Ondols for their use in the colder months.

Gyeonghoeru

Gyeonghoeru, also known as Gyeonghoeru Pavilion, is a hall used to hold important and special state banquets during the Joseon Dynasty. It is registered as Korea's National Treasure No. 224 on January 8, 1985.

The first Gyeonghoeru was constructed in 1412, the 12th year of the reign of King Taejong, but was burned down during the Japanese invasions of Korea in 1592. The present building was constructed in 1867 (the 4th year of the reign of King Gojong) on an island of an artificial, rectangular lake that is 128 m wide and 113 m across.

Constructed mainly of wood and stone, Gyeonghoeru has a form where the wooden structure of the building sits on top of 48 massive stone pillars, with wooden stairs connecting the second floor to the first floor. The outer perimeters of Gyeonghoeru are supported by square pillars while the inner columns are cylindrical; they were placed thus to represent the idea of Yin & Yang. When Gyeonghoeru was originally built in 1412, these stone pillars were decorated with sculptures depicting dragons rising to the sky, but these details were not reproduced when the building was rebuilt in the 19th century.  Three stone bridges connect the building to the palace grounds, and corners of the balustrades around the island are decorated with sculptures depicting twelve Zodiac animals.

Gyeonghoeru used to be represented on the 10,000 won Korean banknotes (1983-2002 Series).

Sujeongjeon

Sujeongjeon, a building located to the south of Gyeonghoeru, was constructed in 1867 and used by the cabinet of the Joseon dynasty.
It is Korea's Treasure No. 1760, where Jiphyeonjeon Hall was located during King Sejong's reign. The historical and architectural value is high because it is the only building that remains in the outer space corresponding to the west side of Geunjeongjeon Hall.

Gangnyeongjeon

Gangnyeongjeon , also called Gangnyeongjeon Hall, is a building used as the king's main residing quarters. First constructed in 1395, the fourth year of King Taejo, the building contains the king's bed-chamber. Destroyed during the Japanese invasions of Korea in 1592, the building was rebuilt when Gyeongbokgung was reconstructed in 1867, but it was again burned down by a major fire in November 1876 and had to be restored in 1888 following the orders of King Gojong.

However, when Huijeongdang of Changdeokgung Palace was burned down by a fire in 1917, the Japanese government dismembered the building and used its construction materials to restore Huijeongdang in 1920. Current Gangnyeongjeon was built in 1994, meticulously restoring the building to its original specifications and design.

Gangnyeongjeon consists of corridors and fourteen rectangular chambers, each seven chambers located to the left and right side of the building in a layout out like a checkerboard. The king used the central chamber while the court attendants occupied the remaining side chambers to protect, assist, and to receive orders. The building rests on top of a tall stone foundation, and a stone deck or veranda is located in front of the building.

The noted feature of the building is an absence of a top white roof ridge called yongmaru ( in Korean. Many theories exist to explain the absence, of which a prominent one states that, since the king was symbolized as the dragon during the Joseon dynasty, the yongmaru, which contains the letter dragon or yong (龍), cannot rest on top of the king when he is asleep.

Gyotaejeon

Gyotaejeon, also called Gyotaejeon Hall, is a building used as the main residing quarters by the queen during the Joseon Dynasty.  The building is located behind Gangnyeongjeon, the king's quarters, and contains the queen's bed chamber. It was first constructed in around 1440, the 22nd year of King Sejong the Great.

King Sejong, who was noted to have a frail health later in his reign, decided to carry out his executive duties in Gangnyeongjeon, where his bed-chamber is located, instead of Sajeongjeon. Since this decision meant many government officials routinely needed to visit and intrude Gangnyeongjeon, King Sejong had Gyotaejeon built in consideration of his wife the queen's privacy.

The building was burned down in 1592 when the Japanese invaded Korea, but was reconstructed in 1867. Nevertheless, when Daejojeon of Changdeokgung Palace was burned down by a fire in 1917, the Japanese government disassembled the building and recycled its construction materials to restore Daejojeon.  The current building was reconstructed in 1994 according to its original design and specifications. The building, like Gangnyeongjeon, does not have a top roof ridge called yongmaru.

Amisan, a famous garden created from an artificial mound, is located behind Gyotaejeon. Four hexagonal chimneys, constructed around 1869 in orange bricks and decorative roof tiles, adorn Amisan without showing their utilitarian function and are notable examples of formative art created during the Joseon Dynasty.  The chimneys were registered as Korea's Treasure No. 811 on January 8, 1985.

Hyangwonjeong

Hyangwonjeong, or Hyangwonjeong Pavilion, is a small, two-story hexagonal pavilion built around 1873 by the order of King Gojong when Geoncheonggung residence was built to the north within Gyeongbokgung.

The pavilion was constructed on an artificial island of a lake named Hyangwonji, and a bridge named Chwihyanggyo connects it to the palace grounds. The name Hyangwonjeong is loosely translated as "Pavilion of Far-Reaching Fragrance", while Chwihyanggyo is "Bridge Intoxicated with Fragrance".

The bridge Chwihyanggyo was originally located on the north side of the island and was the longest bridge constructed purely of wood during the Joseon dynasty; however, it was destroyed during the Korean War. The bridge was reconstructed in its present form on the south side of the island in 1953, but is now being relocated to its original location on the north side. The reconstruction was completed in 2019.

Jagyeongjeon

Jagyeongjeon, also called Jagyeongjeon Hall, is a building used as the main residing quarters by Queen Sinjeong, the mother of King Heonjong. First constructed in 1865, it was burned down twice by a fire but was reconstructed in 1888. Jagyeongjeon is the only royal residing quarters in Gyeongbokgung that survived the demolition campaigns of the Japanese government during the Japanese occupation of Korea.

The chimneys of Jagyeongjeon are decorated with ten signs of longevity to wish for a long life for the late queen, while the west walls of the Jagyeongjeon compound are adorned with floral designs. The protruding southeast part of Jagyeongjeon, named Cheongyeollu, is designed to provide a cooler space during the summer, while the northwest part of Jagyeongjeon, named Bogandang, is designed for the winter months. The eastern part of Jagyeogjeon, named Hyeopgyeongdang and distinguished by the building's lower height, was used by the late queen's assistants.

The building and the decorative walls were registered as Korea's Treasure No. 809 on January 8, 1985.

Jibokjae

Jibokjae, located next to Geoncheonggung Residence, is a two-story private library used by King Gojong. In 1876, a major fire occurred in Gyeongbokgung Palace, and King Gojong, for a brief period, moved and resided in Changdeokgung Palace. He eventually moved back to Gyeongbokgung in 1888, but he had the pre-existing Jibokjae building disassembled and moved from Changdeokgung to the present location in 1891. Its name, Jibokjae, translates loosely in English as the "Hall of Collecting Jade".

The building uniquely shows heavy influence of Chinese architecture instead of traditional Korean palace architecture. Its side walls were entirely constructed in brick, a method commonly employed by the contemporary Chinese, and its roof formations, interior screens, and columns also show Chinese influences. Its architecture possibly was meant to give it an exotic appearance.

Jibokjae is flanked by Parujeong, an octagonal two-story pavilion, to the left and Hyeopgildang to the right. Parujeong was constructed to store books, while Hyeopgildang served as a part of Jibokjae. Both of the buildings are internally connected to Jibokjae.

Bohyeondang and Gahoejeong, buildings that also formed a library complex to the south of Jibokjae, were demolished by the Japanese government in the early 20th century.

Taewonjeon
Taewonjeon, or Taewonjeon Shrine, is an ancestral shrine originally built in 1868 to house a portrait of King Taejo, the founder of the Joseon dynasty, and to perform rites to the deceased royalties. Completely destroyed by the Japanese government in the early 20th century, the shrine was accurately restored to its former design in 2005.

Donggung

Donggung, located south of the Hyangwonjeong pavilion, were the living quarters for the crown prince and his wife. The four main buildings of the compound were Jaseondang and Bihyeongak, Chunbang (the lecture hall, where the prince received the preparatory education in order to become a future monarch), as well as Gyebang (the security building).

In the 19th century, the future Emperor Sunjong lived in the compound. Donggung was razed to the ground during the Japanese occupation. The restoration work started in 1999 but only Jaseondang and Bihyeongak were restored.
In 2020, the Royal Palaces and Tombs Center (hereinafter RPTC) of the Cultural Heritage Administration (CHA) announced its plans to restore the Donggung area to its original layout. The restoration work of the remaining buildings began in March 2020 and was planned to be completed in late Jan. 2023

Geoncheonggung

Geoncheonggung, also known as Geoncheonggung Residence, was a private royal residence built by King Gojong within the palace grounds in 1873.

King Gojong resided in Geoncheonggung from 1888 and the residence was continuously expanded, but on October 8, 1895, Empress Myeongseong, the wife of King Gojong, was brutally assassinated by the Japanese agents at the residence. Her body was burned and buried near the residence.

Haunted by the experiences of the incident, the king left the palace in January 1896 and never again returned to the residence. Demolished completely by the Japanese government in 1909, the residence was accurately reconstructed to its former design and opened to the public in 2007.

Governor-General's Residence (dismantled)
The back garden of Gyeongbokgung used to contain the main part of the Japanese Governor-General's residence, that was built in the early 20th century during the Japanese occupation. With the establishment of the Republic of Korea in 1948, President Syngman Rhee used it as his office and residence. In 1993, after President Kim Young-sam's civilian administration was launched, the Japanese Governor-General's residence in the Cheongwadae compound was dismantled to remove a major symbol of the Japanese colonialism.

Tourism

In 2011 a survey was conducted by the Seoul Development Institute, which included 800 residents and 103 urban planners and architects. 39 percent of residents voted the palace as the most scenic location in Seoul, following Mount Namsan and Han River in the top spots.

Events
In a poll of nearly 2,000 foreign visitors, conducted by the Seoul Metropolitan Government in November 2011, stated that watching the changing of the guards at the main gate Gwanghwamun is their third favorite activity in Seoul. The royal changing of the guard ceremony is held in front of the main gate every hour from 10:00 to 15:00.
There are many tourists wearing hanbok while visiting Gyeongbokgung.
There are rental shops close to Gyeongbokgung.

This year, the number of night tours exclusively for foreigners at Gyeongbokgung Palace will be increased to 14 from 3 last year.

At Gyeongbokgung Palace, a program called “Suragan Tasting Sympathy”, you can experience royal food and watch traditional performances.

On selected days from April to October, Gyeongbokgung offers special 'nighttime viewing' sessions from 7PM to 10PM. 4,500 tickets are offered each session which could be reserved online or purchased on-site (ID required). However, on-site tickets are available only for foreigners and senior citizens age 65 and over, for which 500 and 50 tickets are allocated respectively. In 2019, Gyeongbokgung held 71 nighttime viewing sessions.

From September 1, 2022 to November 6, 2022, Gyeongbokgung offers special 'nighttime viewing' sessions from 7PM to 9:30PM The admission fee is 3,000 won. Online reservations and on-site reservations are available, and up to two tickets are available per person.

Access

Today, the Gyeongbokgung Palace is open to the public and houses the National Folk Museum of Korea, the National Palace Museum of Korea, and traditional Korean gardens.

Transportation
Gyeongbokgung entry is located 22 Sajik-ro, Jongno-gu. The nearest subway station is
 Gyeongbokgung Station (Station #327 on Line 3).

There has been off and on talk to extending the Shinbundang Line near the palace including during a March 2012 campaign promise by Hong Sa-duk to expand the line near Gyeongbok Palace.

Entrance Fee

See also

 Joseon Dynasty architecture
 Five Grand Palaces — of Joseon Dynasty, in Seoul.
 Korean architecture
 History of Korea
 Imperial City of Huế
 Forbidden City
 Potala Palace

References

Bibliography

External links

 Official homepage
 Official guide from Cultural Heritage Administration
 Gyeongbok Palace
 Video of Royal Gate Ceremony, Gyeongbokgung
 The Seoul Guide : Gyeongbokgung Palace

Palaces in South Korea
Buildings and structures in Seoul
Historic house museums in Asia
History of Seoul
Jongno District
Joseon dynasty works
Museums in Seoul
Rebuilt buildings and structures in South Korea
Royal residences in South Korea
Tourist attractions in Seoul
World Heritage Sites in South Korea
Joseon Industrial